The University of Technology of Belfort-Montbéliard (UTBM) is a Grande École university. of engineering located in Belfort, Sevenans and Montbéliard, France. The University of Technology of Belfort-Montbéliard is part of the network of the three universities of technology. Inspired by the American University of Pennsylvania in Philadelphia, these three universities (UTC, UTBM and UTT) are a French mixture between the universities of this country and its schools of engineers (Grandes écoles).

Their teaching model is a mix between the North-American model and the French traditions:  courses choice, separation of the courses, tutorials / directed work (TDs) and labs / practical work (TPs).  These three universities give an engineering degree equivalent to the Bac+5 formations of the French Grandes Ecoles.

Alumni 
UTBM alumni include: Yukiya Amano, Claude Lorius, Jean-Baptiste Waldner

See also 
 Université de Technologie
 The University of Technology of Compiègne (Université de Technologie de Compiègne or UTC)
 The University of Technology of Troyes (Université de Technologie de Troyes or UTT)

Notes

External links 
 UTBM website
 Universités de technologie network

Educational institutions established in 1999
Universities of technology
Education in Belfort
Education in Montbéliard
1999 establishments in France